Barnby Moor and Sutton railway station served the village of Barnby Moor and Sutton cum Lound, Nottinghamshire, England from 1850 to 1949 on the East Coast Main Line.

History 
The station opened as Sutton and Barnby Moor in July 1850 by the Great Northern Railway.  The station's name was changed to Sutton in September 1850 and changed again to Barnby Moor and Sutton on 16 November 1909. The station closed to both passengers and freight traffic on 7 November 1949.

References 

Disused railway stations in Nottinghamshire
Former Great Northern Railway stations
Railway stations in Great Britain opened in 1850
Railway stations in Great Britain closed in 1949
1850 establishments in England
1949 disestablishments in England
Barnby Moor